Ambrosiodmus is a genus of typical bark beetles in the family Curculionidae. There are at least 100 described species in Ambrosiodmus.

See also
 List of Ambrosiodmus species

References

Further reading

External links

 

Scolytinae
Articles created by Qbugbot